Kepler-25b is an extrasolar planet orbiting the star Kepler-25, located in the constellation Lyra. The planet was first detected as a candidate extrasolar planet by the Kepler space telescope in 2011. It was confirmed, in 2012, by Jason Steffen and collaborators using transit-timing variations obtained by the Kepler Space Telescope.

References

Kepler-25
Exoplanets discovered by the Kepler space telescope
Exoplanets discovered in 2012